MV Lochmor was a ferry operated by Caledonian MacBrayne serving the Small Isles from 1979 until 2001. Since 2009 she has operated cruises from Poole as MV Jurassic Scene.

History
Ailsa Shipbuilders of Troon won a tender in 1978 for an  vessel to replace the converted minesweeper,  which served the Small Isles for 15 years.

Layout
MV Lochmor had a raised main deck that was open at the stern for cargo. When required, there was space for two cars. Cargo loading was aided by a starboard crane. Forward, there were two passenger saloons on the lower deck, with the bridge on an upper deck. A landing platform, above the bridge, was used at the extreme low water found at Mallaig.

The superstructure has subsequently been extended back to surround the funnel.

Service
MV Lochmors predecessor, Loch Arkaig sank at her berth in Mallaig in March 1979. Her place was taken by  until MV Lochmor entered service on 18 July.

From Mallaig, MV Lochmor served the islands of Rùm, Eigg, Muck and Canna, as well as Armadale, Skye and Kyle of Lochalsh. She also gave cruises to Loch Duich, the Crowlin Islands and Portree. Of the Small Isles, only Canna had a pier that she could go alongside. On the other islands a ferry boat met the main ferry.

She was sold to Landwest Corp Ltd, Argyll and renamed MV Loch Awe. During this period of ownership by Landwest, the ship was maintained, certificated and crewed by Landwest Corporation's sister company Argyll Ferries Ltd.

From 2003 she operated as MV Torbay Belle for Brixham Belle Cruises of Paignton. In 2009 she was sold to Blue Line Cruises of Poole and renamed MV Jurassic Scene. She now operates cruises on the south coast of England, from Poole.

Since 2015 the ship has operated whale watching tours out of Reykjavik. As of 2017 the vessel's name is MV Sailor.

References

External links 
Reykjavik Operators
Argyll Ferries Originally A Subsidiary of Argyll Group plc

Caledonian MacBrayne
Ships built in Scotland
1979 ships